Hermann Alker (13 March 1885 – 26 May 1967) was a German architect. His work was part of the art competitions at the 1928 Summer Olympics, the 1932 Summer Olympics, and the 1936 Summer Olympics.

References

1885 births
1967 deaths
20th-century German architects
Olympic competitors in art competitions
People from Bad Dürkheim (district)